Big Bar, California may refer to:
Big Bar, Butte County, California
Big Bar, Trinity County, California
Mokelumne Hill, California, formerly Big Bar